The Canadian Association of Orthodontists (CAO; French: Association canadienne des orthodontistes, ACO), founded in 1949, is the Canadian national organization of educationally qualified orthodontic specialists. Its headquarters are in Markham, Ontario.

The association is dedicated to the advancement or orthodontics and the promotion of quality orthodontic care in Canada.  The CAO advances the science and art of orthodontics, works for higher standards of excellence in the practice of orthodontics, protects the rights of its members as certified specialists in orthodontics, and promotes public awareness of the benefits of orthodontic health care rendered by certified specialists in orthodontists.

The association has four classes of members:

 Active members (a person who is registered as an orthodontic specialist with a dental regulatory authority in Canada)
 Student members (graduate and post-graduate students providing evidence of active enrolment in an approved graduate level program)
 Academic members (persons who have completed a university level program in orthodontics and are employed full-time in an accredited university orthodontic program)
 Life-Active members (active or academic members who have been members of the Association for 40 consecutive years)

Orthodontists are dental specialists in the diagnosis, prevention and treatment of orthodontic problems, and who have completed a minimum of two academic years of study in an accredited orthodontic residency program.  Only those dentists who have completed this training may call themselves "orthodontists", and only orthodontists may be members of the Canadian Association of Orthodontists.

The CAO is affiliated with the American Association of Orthodontists.

References

External links

 Canadian Association of Orthodontists

1949 establishments in Ontario
Dental organizations based in Canada
Orthodontic organizations